Columbus Buckeyes may refer to:

 Columbus Buckeyes (minor league) A minor league team in the International Association in 1877
 Columbus Buckeyes (AA), a baseball team in the American Association from 1883 to 1884
 Columbus Buckeyes (Negro leagues), a Negro National League team in 1921